Sonny Phillips (born December 7, 1936) is an American jazz keyboardist. His primary instrument is electronic organ but he often plays piano.

Biography
Phillips began playing jazz organ after hearing Jimmy Smith in his twenties. He studied under Ahmad Jamal, and played in the 1960s and 1970s with Lou Donaldson, Nicky Hill, Eddie Harris, Houston Person, and Gene Ammons. His debut album was released in 1969, and he released several further records as a leader before suffering a long illness in 1980. He went into semi-retirement after this and moved to Los Angeles; since then he has performed and taught occasionally.

Discography

As leader
Sure 'Nuff (Prestige, 1969; reissued on BGP/Ace in 1993) -with Houston Person, Boogaloo Joe Jones
Black Magic! (Prestige, 1970; reissued on BGP/Ace in 1993)
Black on Black! (Prestige, 1970) -with Rusty Bryant, Melvin Sparks
My Black Flower (Muse, 1976; reissued on 32 Jazz in 1999)
I Concentrate On You (Muse, 1977)
Legends Of Acid Jazz: Sonny Phillips (Prestige, 1997) (compilation of Sure 'Nuff + Black On Black!)

As sideman
With Gene Ammons
The Boss Is Back! (Prestige, 1969)
Brother Jug! (Prestige, 1969)
Got My Own (Prestige, 1972)
Big Bad Jug (Prestige, 1972)
With Rusty Bryant
Rusty Bryant Returns (Prestige, 1969)
With Billy Butler
Guitar Soul! (Prestige, 1969)
Yesterday, Today & Tomorrow (Prestige, 1970)
With Eddie Harris
Mean Greens (Atlantic, 1966)
With Willis Jackson
In the Alley (Muse, 1976)
With Etta Jones
If You Could See Me Now (Muse, 1978)
Don't Misunderstand: Live In New York (High Note, 1980)
With Boogaloo Joe Jones
Boogaloo Joe (Prestige, 1969)
No Way! (Prestige, 1970)
Black Whip (Prestige, 1973)
With Houston Person
Goodness! (Prestige, 1969)
Truth! (Prestige, 1970)
Person to Person! (Prestige, 1970)
The Real Thing (Eastbound, 1973)
Stolen Sweets (Muse, 1976)
Wild Flower (Muse, 1977)
The Nearness of You (Muse, 1977)
Suspicions (Muse, 1980)
With Bernard Purdie
Coolin' 'N Groovin' (A Night At "On-Air") (Lexington/West 47th, 1993)

References
[ Sonny Phillips] at Allmusic

1936 births
Living people
American jazz organists
American male organists
Muse Records artists
Prestige Records artists
Jazz musicians from Alabama
21st-century organists
21st-century American male musicians
American male jazz musicians
21st-century American keyboardists
20th-century American keyboardists
20th-century American male musicians